Pirkko Onerva Lepistö, (1922-2005) was a Finnish painter with naivistic style being one of the most known in Finland.

References

1922 births
2005 deaths
20th-century Finnish painters